Winds of Plague is an American deathcore band from Upland, California. Formed in 2002, the band is known for being the first of several deathcore bands to incorporate symphonic elements into their music.

The band's name is derived from a section of lyrics in the Unearth song "Endless": "Growing wings of sorrow/have brought you to the winds of plague."

History

Formation, name change, and early releases (2002–2005) 
Winds of Plague was founded in 2002 in Upland, California. During the time of the band's inception, its name was originally Bleak December. However, they changed their name in April 2005, to Winds of Plague, being named after a lyric from the Unearth song, "Endless".
They released their demo A Cold Day in Hell in late 2005 independently. Several of the songs would subsequently be re-recorded for the following album.

Decimate the Weak (2006–2009) 
Decimate the Weak, the band's first album for Century Media Records, was released in 2008. The album included several re-recorded tracks  from A Cold Day In Hell.

The Great Stone War and line-up changes (2009–2011) 
The Great Stone War was released on August 11, 2009. The album features two singles, "Approach the Podium" and "Chest and Horns", though no music videos were ever shot for any songs on the album.
On October 14, 2009, keyboardist Kristen Randall stated that she would be leaving the band and did so days afterward. The band approached musician Lisa Marx to fill in on keyboard for their Australian/New Zealand tour. Afterwards the band found Alana Potocnik who has since been inducted as Winds of Plague's keyboardist.

Against the World (2011–2013) 
Against the World was released in 2011 to widespread critical acclaim. "Refined in the Fire" and "California" have been released as singles, and music videos for "Drop the Match", "California" and "Refined in the Fire" have also been released. The band also appeared on the soundtrack for the game Homefront performing a cover of the Buffalo Springfield song "For What It's Worth". A cover of "Zombie" by The Cranberries was included in an iTunes extended play for "California", but the EP was later removed from the iTunes store for unknown reasons.

Resistance (2013–2016) 
Winds of Plague's fourth studio album, Resistance, was recorded in early to mid-2013 and was released on October 29, 2013.

In December 2015, while playing the Affliction Metal Show at The Observatory in Santa Ana with Suicide Silence, vocalist Johnny Plague announced that after going through a brief hiatus, Winds of Plague would resume touring and working on a new album in 2016.

Blood of My Enemy (2017–present) 
Winds of Plague's fifth studio album, Blood of My Enemy, was recorded from 2016 to 2017 and was released on October 27, 2017.

Tours 
The band has toured with Despised Icon, Parkway Drive, Impending Doom, Danzig, Dimmu Borgir, Veil of Maya, With Dead Hands Rising, and As Blood Runs Black. They also played at the New England Metal and Hardcore Festival, toured the US on the "Blackest of the Black" tour and finished a 2010 Japan tour with Parkway Drive, 50 Lions, Despised Icon, The Warriors, and Terror.
They were featured on The Atticus Metal Tour with Emmure, All Shall Perish, Abacabb, Terror, and The Ghost Inside.
In the summer of 2009 was in the Summer Slaughter tour with Necrophagist, Suffocation, Darkest Hour and others. After the Summer Slaughter tour, they joined Hatebreed, Chimaira, Dying Fetus, and Toxic Holocaust on the Decimation of the Nation tour.
On January 20, 2010, it was announced that Winds of Plague would be playing on the Jägermeister Stage at the 2010 Rockstar Mayhem Festival in July and August.
During April 2010, Winds of Plague toured with Despised Icon, The Warriors, Parkway Drive, and 50 Lions for Parkway Drive's UK and Europe Tour.
During February 2011, Winds of Plague toured in the US with After the Burial and headliners As I Lay Dying. They played several songs from their then upcoming new album.
They played the entire Warped Tour 2011 on the Advent Clothing stage along with The Acacia Strain, Set Your Goals, We Came As Romans and others. They will also be headlining the 2011 "Thrash and Burn" tour with Chelsea Grin, As Blood Runs Black, and numerous others.
They replaced All Shall Perish during Caliban's "Get Infected" Tour 2012 with support of We Butter the Bread with Butter, Eyes Set To Kill and Attila which started off on February 2 in Karlsruhe, Germany.  For their 2014 tour supporting Bleeding Through, with Scars of Tomorrow and Lionheart, Johnny Plague was unable to perform due to undisclosed circumstances.  Rather than leave the tour, the band opted to have Mike Milford (of Scars of Tomorrow) fill in on vocals.
The band did a tour in February 2017 with DevilDriver, Death Angel, the Agonist, and Azrael.
Just recently, the band also did a tour on the first ever Chaos & Carnage tour supporting Carnifex. Oceano, Archspire, Spite, Buried Above Ground, Shadow of Intent and Widowmaker were also on the tour.

Members 

Current members
 Jonathan "Johnny Plague" Cooke-Hayden – unclean vocals ; bass 
 Michael Montoya – lead guitar 
 Justin Bock – rhythm guitar ; bass 
 Adrienne Cowan – keyboards, clean vocals 
 Shane Slade – bass 
 Josh Johnson – drums, percussion 

Former members
 Josh Blackburn – guitars, bass 
 Raffi – drums 
 Brandon Pitcher – keyboards 
 Paul Salem – bass, keyboards 
 Corey Fine – percussion ; drums ; keyboards 
 Kevin Grant – bass 
 Chris Cooke – keyboards 
 Matt Feinman – keyboards 
 Jeff Tenney – drums, percussion 
 Kristen Randall – keyboards, clean vocals 
 Lisa Marx – keyboards 
 Nick Eash – lead guitar ; rhythm guitar, bass ; keyboards 
 Nick Piunno – rhythm guitar ; lead guitar, bass ; keyboards 
 Andrew Glover – bass 
 Brandon Galindo – drums, percussion 
 Tyler Riley – guitars 
 Davey Oberlin – rhythm guitar 
 Chris Silva – bass 
 Alana Potocnik – keyboards 
 Art Cruz – drums, percussion 

Timeline

Discography

Studio albums 

Demos

Other releases

Music videos

(2008) "The Impaler" (from the album Decimate the Weak)
(2011) "Drop the Match" (from the album Against the World)
(2011) "California" (from the album Against the World)
(2013) "Open the Gates of Hell" (from the album Resistance)
(2013) "Say Hello to the Undertaker" (from the album Resistance)
(2017) "Never Alone" (from the album Blood of My Enemy)

References

External links

Death metal musical groups from California
American deathcore musical groups
American symphonic metal musical groups
Metalcore musical groups from California
Musical groups established in 2002
Century Media Records artists
2002 establishments in California